Vadim Belousov (born 2 October 1960, Chelyabinsk) is a Russian political figure and a deputy of the 6th, 7th, and 8th State Dumas.
 
From 1993 to 1995, Belousov worked as an engineer at the Chelyabinsk branch of the Research Institute of the Tractor Institute. In 1997, Vadim Belousov joined the board of directors of Makfa APO. From 2004 to 2011, he held the position of General Director of Makfa Management Company LLC. In 2010-2011, he was the deputy of the Legislative Assembly of Chelyabinsk Oblast of the 5th convocation. In December 2011, he was elected deputy of the 6th State Duma. In 2016, he left the United Russia with which he previously ran. In September 2016, he received a vacant mandate from the deputy Sergei Doronin for the 7th State Duma. Since September 2021, he has served as deputy of the 8th State Duma.
 
In 2018, Belousov lost parliamentary immunity due to an initiated criminal case against him on the largest bribe in the history of Russia of 3,25 billion rubles. According to the investigation, from 2010 to 2014, Belousov, together with the governor of the Chelyabinsk Oblast Mikhail Yurevich received a bribe for the alleged patronage of entrepreneurs so that they would receive tenders for the construction and maintenance of regional roads without competition. Besides Belousov, his wife and mother-in-law were also involved in the scheme. Belousov did not admit his guilt.
 
On 3 August 2022 he was found guilty and sentenced to 10 years of imprisonment. However, he did not come to the court for sentencing and is considered fugitive from justice.

References
 

 

1969 births
Living people
A Just Russia politicians
21st-century Russian politicians
Eighth convocation members of the State Duma (Russian Federation)
Seventh convocation members of the State Duma (Russian Federation)
Sixth convocation members of the State Duma (Russian Federation)
Politicians from Chelyabinsk